The 1991–92 Campionato Sammarinese di Calcio season was the 7th season since its establishment. It was contested by 10 teams, and S.S. Montevito won the championship.

Regular season

Results

Championship playoff

First round
S.P. Cailungo 2-2 (pen 4-2) S.P. Tre Penne
S.P. Tre Fiori 2-2 (pen 2-4) A.C. Libertas

Second round
S.P. Tre Penne 1-0 S.P. Tre Fiori
S.P. Cailungo 2-3 A.C. Libertas

Third round
S.P. Cailungo 0-0 (pen 4-5) S.P. Tre Penne
S.S. Montevito 0-3 A.C. Libertas

Semifinal
S.S. Montevito 4-1 S.P. Tre Penne

Final
S.S. Montevito 4-2 A.C. Libertas

References
San Marino - List of final tables (RSSSF)

Campionato Sammarinese di Calcio
San Marino
1991–92 in San Marino football